The Republic Building is a historic commercial building located in Louisville, Kentucky.The building is located at the northeast corner of Fifth Street and Muhammad Ali Boulevard, and neighbors the historic Starks Building. Prior to the renaming of several streets, Muhammad Ali Boulevard was known as Walnut Street. The mailing address is 429 West Muhammad Ali Boulevard. The building is one of the early Louisville office buildings to be designed by the prominent local architecture firm Joseph and Joseph, which still operates today. The architecture of the Republic Building was strongly influenced by the classical revival movement, specifically elements of the Italian Renaissance.

History 
The Republic Building began construction in 1912 by builder C. A. Koerner and Company, and was completed in 1916. The building is the work of the local architectural firm of Joseph and Joseph, founded by brothers Alfred and Oscar Joseph. Alfred began his architectural career with the office of McDonald & Dodd. The firm of Joseph & Joseph was founded in 1908 and their early works reflect the influence of both Dodd and the McDonald Brothers. The work of Joseph and Joseph in the first quarter of the twentieth century shows an emphasis towards Mediterranean influence, especially that of the Spanish and Italian Renaissance. The use of terracotta and glazed brick, a rich sense of color and textural contrast, are all features of their work. These features are all evident in the Republic Building. The structure is one of the major early works of the firm to survive. The original owner was Republic Realty in 1915. Subsequent owners include Byron & Lula Brubaker (1944), Robert A. Futterman (1955), Republic Investors (1956), BHS Co. and Republic Assocs. (1974), and Oxford Properties (1980). On August 12, 1982, the Republic Building was added to the National Register of Historic Places. The Republic Building was purchased for $3,150,000 by the National Historic Property Developer and real estate company Hudson Holdings on July 31, 2015. Hudson Holdings plans to preserve the historic building, and rehabilitate it into a boutique hotel building.

About Hudson Holdings LLC 
Hudson Holdings is a national historic property developer. Hudson Holdings, and its two founding partners, Steven Michael and Andrew Greenbaum, specialize in historic preservation, historic restoration, and historic adaptive re-use projects. Located in Delray Beach, Florida, Hudson Holdings mission is the acquisition, development and adaptive reuse of significant and large scale retail, residential, hotel and office properties. The company's slate of mixed-use historic restoration and historic preservation projects, most notably in central, downtown and core business districts across the country comprises nearly 5 million square feet of space valued in excess more than $1.2 billion. Major historic renovation projects include: The Huntington Building, Mark Twain Tower, Republic Building, Railway Exchange Building, Starks Building, Textile Building, Gulfstream Hotel, Sundy House, and Midtown Delray Beach. The company's current projects include ground-up construction, renovation, and adaptive use of residential, retail, office and hospitality assets. Hudson Holdings uses various methods to increase asset value including adaptive use, ground up construction, re-positioning and rehabilitation. The company's developmental strategy also utilizes tax credits such as Historic, Brownfield, New Market, and TIFs.

References 

Buildings and structures in Louisville, Kentucky
National Register of Historic Places in Louisville, Kentucky
Office buildings completed in 1916